Samuel Lawrence Lopez Concepcion (born October 17, 1992) is a Filipino singer, dancer, actor, VJ and host. Concepcion emerged as the winner for the Big Division of the first season of Little Big Star in April 2006. Concepcion currently has a contract under STAGES and ABS-CBN's Star Magic. Concepcion began with a total of 12 theater roles and participated in various plays even at a young age, including the role of Edmund Pevensie in the local stage adaptation of The Lion, The Witch, and The Wardrobe and Mr. Noah's Big Boat. He has been in the role of Peter Pan from 2002 to 2012. Aside from theater roles, he has acted in movies including Way Back Home and Shake, Rattle & Roll 13. He acted in his first lead role in 2012 in the first Filipino musical-film entitled, I Do Bidoo Bidoo: Heto nAPO Sila!. He had his first role in television in ABS-CBN's Mga Anghel na Walang Langit, and his major break as Boy Bawang in the fantasy series Super Inggo.

In 2007, Concepcion launched his self-titled album under Universal Records, which was certified Gold by the Philippine Association of the Record Industry. He also launched two other albums Pop Class (2010), and Forever Young (2011). The latter was his biggest hit, hitting the charts at Number 1 for seven weeks in a row. In 2008, Concepcion was chosen by DreamWorks to sing the theme song of the animated movie Kung Fu Panda, entitled, "Kung Fu Fighting" which was included in the Asian soundtrack album. With this project, Concepcion is the first Filipino artist to have collaborated with DreamWorks.

Concepcion has been an ambassador for many agencies and organizations. He was appointed by the Department of Education as 'Youth Role Model and Spokesperson' and National Book Development Board's (NBDB) 'Get Caught Reading campaign' ambassador in 2007. In 2008, Concepcion was appointed by the Business Software Alliance as the Official Spokesperson of the Philippines for 'B4USurf', 'Youth Ambassador for Education and the Arts' in the 3rd District of Manila and World Vision's 'Ambassador for Children'.

Concepcion was also given a representative role by the Department of Tourism to the Korea World Travel Fair (2006). He was also chosen by the Philippine government to sing in front of the President of the Philippines, Gloria Macapagal Arroyo and top world economic leaders during APEC's 'Business Advisory Council Gala' opening. He was awarded by the United Nations Youth Association of the Philippines the prestigious United Nations Association of the Philippines "Outstanding Youth Leader Awards" given in Malacañang Palace in 2009.

Early life
Concepcion was born on October 17, 1992, in Manila, to Raymund Concepcion and Gene Concepcion, both actors from the Metropolitan Theater. He is the third of four children and siblings to Kuya Red (24), Diko Kevin (23) and as Sangko Sam(19) to their younger sister, Gabby (13). After he was born, their parents eventually stopped in theater acting so they were not able to see them perform, however, it leads Concepcion to do theater roles as his parents did. Concepcion was home schooled under the International Studies. As early as two years old, Concepcion was already able to carry a tune and dance to simple songs. At five years old, he had his first public performance at a worship cantata which later landed him the role of the young Jose Rizal in a stage play entitled, Sino Ka Ba, Jose Rizal?. During the play, he was discovered by David Cosico, a talent manager, who then encouraged Concepcion to sign up with S.T.A.G.E.S and enroll in Trumpets Playshop music theatre class to further hone his talents and potential. Concepcion already had various plays under his name, as early as nine years of age. This included the role of Edmund Pevensie in the local stage adaptation of The Lion, The Witch, and The Wardrobe, Peter Pan and the Time Machine and Mr. Noah's Big Boat. Aside from theatre plays, Concepcion also did not appear on television through a commercial featuring him and his real-life dad in Maggi Sinigang sa Miso. He also appeared on various shows for children on ABS-CBN, such as Sineskwela and Hirayamanawari. Concepcion even had a regular hosting stint on ABC-5's (now TV5's) A.S.T.I.G. (All Set To Imitate God), a show about God made for children.

Concepcion's musical influences include Gary Valenciano, Michael Jackson, Justin Timberlake, Chris Brown, Billy Crawford and Christian Bautista. In fact, Concepcion was even invited to guest in two of Christian Bautista's concerts namely, Dunkin Donuts: Color Everywhere in March 2005 and Heartfelt in November 2005.

Career

2005–2006:Little Big Star championship and career beginnings

Concepcion's major television exposure came through Little Big Star, a singing competition on ABS-CBN hosted by Sarah Geronimo, which searched for young singing talents. He was initially dubbed as the Singing Crush ng Bayan throughout the duration of show as he became the crowd's favorite. In fact, he was awarded the My Favorite Star Award for having the most votes from viewers, garnering 52% of the total votes, which was the highest vote percentage among the show's competitors. During the Grand Finals, Concepcion sang I Can't Stand Still from Footloose, one of STAGES’ musical productions. He eventually won the whole competition with the title, The Brightest Star for the Big Division over major competitors, Gian Barbarona and Charice. With regard to projects, Concepcion took part in ABS-CBN's primetime shows, and first appeared on a drama series, Mga Anghel na Walang Langit, where he played a minor role. His first major role was in the fantasy series, Super Inggo as Boy Bawang. After winning the competition, Concepcion joined ASAP '06 where he became part of the group, Three-O, with Aldred Gatchalian and Aaron Agassi. The group was later disbanded when Agassi decided to leave. He was also given his first starring role when he was featured on Your Song with Empress Schuck as part of the networks' Christmas offering. The same Your Song episode was again shown in 2007.

In June 2006, Concepcion, along with other Trumpets Playshop talents were tasked by the Philippines' Department of Tourism to represent the country for the Korea World Travel Fair. Their team brought home the Best Folk Performance Award. In the same month, Concepcion was also chosen by the Philippine government to sing in front of the President of the Philippines, Gloria Macapagal Arroyo and top world economic leaders during APEC's Business Advisory Council Gala Opening. In July of the same year, he won Nickelodeon's Pinoy Wannabe Award with 40% of the total votes, which made him the youngest and sole male recipient of the award. In September 2006, Concepcion posed as the magazine's cover for the first time through Candy magazine. In that same issue, he was also announced as the Top Candy Cutie for 2006. He has held the title for three consecutive years already that no other local celebrity has held since. In October 2006, Sam had his first concert via a back-to-back birthday celebration with Christian Bautista.

2007–2009:Self-titled album, contract with Star Magic, awards and solo concerts 
After Super Inggo (2006), Concepcion's next major television project was Walang Kapalit, a television series starring Claudine Barretto and Piolo Pascual. He portrayed the young Noel, who was later portrayed by Pascual. Aside from acting, Concepcion also got to voice dub for the local anime network, Hero TV, as the voice of Koyuki, the protagonist of the Japanese musical anime, Beck. In June 2007, Concepcion went back to theater after his hiatus due to his major television career. He played Ryan Evans in the stage musical of Disney's High School Musical. He played Blaine Anderson in the stage musical of Fox's Glee and another the film School of Rock and Pitch Perfect where in he received positive reviews from the critics.

In September 2007, Concepcion launched his first solo album, self-titled under Universal Records. His first single was Even If, a revived song from the American boy band 2Be3. His second single is a Jackson 5 hit, Happy. The last single from the album, I'll Find Your Heart becomes a success topping various charts of MYX Philippines. The album was later certified Gold by the Philippine Association of the Record Industry.

In February 2008, Concepcion became part of ABS-CBN's Star Magic, with a co-management contract with STAGES and was launched at ASAP '08. In May 2008, Concepcion was chosen by DreamWorks to sing the theme song of the animated movie, Kung Fu Panda, entitled, Kung Fu Fighting which was included in its Asian soundtrack album. With this project, Concepcion is the first Filipino artist to have collaborated with DreamWorks.

Concepcion won "Favorite New Artist" in the 3rd MYX Music Awards held in March 2008. This win made him the youngest winner for the said category as he garnered 61% of the total votes. In 2009, Concepcion then went on to win the Top Teen Male Entertainer award in the first Pure & Fresh Top Teens Awards. In August 2009, Concepcion was awarded by the United Nations Youth Association of the Philippines the prestigious UNAP Outstanding Youth Leader award for his positive achievements in the Entertainment category. The awards night was held on August 7, 2009, at the Malacañan Palace with President Gloria Macapagal Arroyo as its guest of honor.

Aside from album release and theater roles, Concepcion returned to doing regular television shows in August 2008 through the remake of a Colombian series, i ♥ Betty la fea which starred Bea Alonzo. He was also included on a TV5 show, Lipgloss, where he played Kyle, the show's main protagonist. But during the run of its second season, Concepcion left the show. He was then added to a group called GiggerBoys in ASAP together with Enchong Dee, Robi Domingo, the late AJ Perez, Arron Villaflor, Dino Imperial, and Chris Gutierrez. The group was then launched in acting wherein Concepcion played the character of Bobet, the optimist of the group, in Your Song Presents: Boystown in 2009. Soon after, Concepcion, together with 40 Star Magic artists, flew into the United States for the Star Magic World Concert Tour held in Ontario, Canada and San Francisco wherein he did a Michael Jackson-inspired number.

Concepcion staged his first major solo concert dubbed as I'll Find Your Heart held at the Music Museum in October 2008 that coincides with his 16th birthday. Later in the year, Concepcion also held a free Christmas concert at the CCP open grounds. In May 2009, Concepcion held another major concert entitled, I'll Find Your Heart: Part 2 held at the Crossroads77 Convenarium in Quezon City. September 2009 marked Concepcion's return to theater after his last musical back in 2007 was restaged in 2009. With its return, Concepcion still played the role of The Narrator/God for all show times. Concepcion was also chosen to portray the role of the young Noynoy Aquino on Maalaala Mo Kaya which depicted the untold love story of the country's historic icons, Ninoy Aquino and Cory Aquino. By October 2009, Concepcion was hailed Candy's Top Celeb Cutie for the fourth consecutive time. In November 2009, he was hailed by the Consumers League of the Philippines Foundation the Dangal ng Pilipinas for Best Promising Male Young Singer Performer award.

2010–2011: Pop Class, Forever Young and Peter Pan

Concepcion released his second solo album in January 2010 entitled, "Pop Class" under Universal Records. The concept of this album is different from his first album, as this features a mini-musical movie compilation album following the like of Glee and High School Musical. The album's carrier single is an original song entitled, "Missed You".

In 2010, Concepcion became the youngest model to participate in the yearly fashion show of Bench, Bench Uncut 2010. Aside from modelling, Concepcion also starred on the "Braso" (Arm) episode of a Star Cinema trilogy movie, Cinco, alongside Robi Domingo and the late, AJ Perez. In 2011 he acted in the teen oriented show Good Vibes, paired with Coleen Garcia, and in the Star Cinema family movie Way Back Home together with the Mara Clara stars Kathryn Bernardo and Julia Montes.

On February 19, 2011, he was the opening act for Taylor Swift's concert in Manila and sang his hits "Yeah2x", "Kung Fu Fighting", "Even If" and "Fireworks". Manila Bulletin reported that he was personally chosen by the international artist to open for her Asia-leg but it wasn't pushed through as Concepcion only performed at the Manila show. On June 17 of the same year, he was joined by Elmo Magalona as opening acts for Miley Cyrus concert in Manila. According to Nixon Sy of Futuretainment, the two were chosen after they emerged as the top young performers of their respective mother networks – Concepcion for ABS-CBN and Magalona for GMA Network. He also became an endorser of My|Phone cellphone together with some Kapamilya and Kapuso stars like Elmo Magalona, Alden Richards, Julie Anne San Jose and other teen stars from GMA Network and ABS-CBN. Concepcion also showed his directing skills and directed Tippy and Morisette's Face Off concert. He also contributed his time and talents for free when he joined the "Pilipinas, Tara Na!" music video together with the other Filipino artists to boost domestic tourism of the country. In the same year, he became the cover model of Candy mini-magazine. He attended the first ever Candy Magazine press conference, wherein he also attended the Candy Fair 2011 and performed his latest single Forever Young. During this time, he was dethroned as Hottest Candy Cutie by Enzo Pineda. Aside from the Candy Magazine, he was featured in Sense and Style and Total Girl Philippines magazines. In 2011, Concepcion became one of World Vision's Yumbassadors of a fast-food chain, Jollibee alongside eight others including Bam Aquino, Sunshine Plata among others. According to Jollibee, the nine Yumbassadors "...represent the best in every young Pinoy" and "...form a new breed of role models that the country can proudly present to the rest of the world." The company asked the public to take part in recognizing the vision of the youth and help build a nation that is filled with compassionate and civic-minded young citizens.

Concepcion celebrated his 10th anniversary in show business by starring as the lead character of Peter Pan in the musical version which was staged by Repertory Philippines and S.T.A.G.E.S at the Meralco Theater. This production is also the first time that this version of Peter Pan, written by Stiles and Drewe and the late Willis Hall, will be staged in Asia. It relives Sir James Barrie's timeless tale of the boy who never grew up. He also released his third studio album entitled "Forever Young" under Universal Records with Forever Young serves as the single of the album. The single went on to the MYX Philippines Chart at Number 1 for seven consecutive weeks.

2012–2016: I Do Bidoo Bidoo, international career, Infinite and Bago

Concepcion was chosen by composer Soc Villanueva, to sing his composition entitled "Kontrabida". From around 3,000 entries submitted to the first Philippine Popular Music Festival, 14 songs emerged on top including Concepcion's. The song went on the 2nd runner up award losing to Karl Villuga's "Bawat Hakbang" and Toto Sorioso's "Tayo-tayo Lang" who went on 1st and second respectively. Composer Villanueva stated, "I never doubted Sam's talent. Even before he stepped onstage, I knew he would give justice to the song." He further added, "Sam's confidence is just so high and talent is overflowing that I know that the battle is already half-won."

In 2012, Concepcion starred on his first ever movie in a lead role, the first ever Filipino musical-comedy film directed by Chris Martinez entitled, I Do Bidoo Bidoo: Heto nAPO Sila! with his Peter Pan co-star, Tippy Dos Santos. The two were chosen to play the lead role because of their theatrical experience after their successful musical stage play Peter Pan. In an interview of PEP to Concepcion, he stated that the film is going to be his biggest break on his acting career. The film was a tribute to the APO Hiking Society, and also stars singers Ogie Alcasid, Zsa Zsa Padilla, Gary Valenciano and comedian, Eugene Domingo. Concepcion was later nominated at the 10th Golden Screen Awards for Movies for "Best Performance by an Actor in a Lead Role-Musical or Comedy" in 2013.

Concepcion stars on his supposed to be first festival film for 2012 Metro Manila Film Festival that will be held on December 25 of the same year, until it was shelved before shooting took place. However, it will still be released in 2013 as a separate movie. Concepcion and co-Star Magic artist Empress Schuck top bills the second story sub-titled "Mariang Alimango" of a two-story film, Mga Kwento ni Lola Basyang produced by the same director (Chris Martinez) and same film outfit that produces his first film, I Do Bidoo Bidoo.

In July 2012, Concepcion was invited in Indonesia to guest in a morning variety show, Dahsyat Musik on RCTI Channel. He performed his single "Forever Young" and his rendition of "Yeah 3x". This is the first time that he got to perform for Indonesians, wherein he reached the top spot of the trending topics in Indonesia. After his performance, a talent manager in Indonesia immediately talked to Concepcion and his manager for a future career in the country. According to Concepcion on an interview, this will be his stepping stone to penetrate the Asian market. In the same month, he released his single "Forever Young" in Indonesia under THREE Heiz artist management. The actor will soon be in Indonesian dramas, recordings and commercial endorsements. Following his guesting on the show, Concepcion won as "Most Awesome Guest" on Dahsyat Awards in Indonesia in 2013.

Concepcion is set to release his second full-length album, Infinite on August 10, 2013, under Universal Records which was originally set for April release. The album celebrates his 10th anniversary in the music industry. He stated, "It's totally different from the way I used to sound. It's a new sound and a new look for me as a recording artist. That's one thing that my fans can look forward to." He also added, "It's going to be new music for me, something that you haven't heard me do.". He also revealed that part of 2013 will be dedicated to his international career. He released his first single "No Limitations" ahead of his album on May 24, 2013, through digital download which became no. 1 for five consecutive weeks. On June 25, it was announced that he will again take part on the Philippine Popular Music Festival to sing "Dati" with Tippy Dos Santos and Quest. The song was written by Thyro Alfaro and Yumi Lacsamana. Also in 2013, Concepcion was chosen as one of the new VJs for myx through private auditions – the first year where MYX did not hold public auditions in the Myx VJ Search.

Concepcion is also set to appear in an upcoming series of ABS-CBN entitled as Mira Bella in 2014, with young actors Julia Barretto and Enrique Gil. In an interview with ABS-CBN News, Concepcion said it has been a while since he played the lead character and this is a good opportunity for him to hone his skills and become a better actor. Concepcion had released Teka Break single for his upcoming album due to release in mid-2015 under Universal Records.

2017–present: Recent projects

In 2017 Concepcion signed under the management of Viva Artist Agency (VAA), but signed a contract with the owner of Star Magic as well. Concepcion appeared on a minor role in the movie, Miss Granny in 2018. In 2019, he appeared as lead in a film Indak, a dance musical film directed by Paul Basinillo under Viva Films together with Nadine Lustre. This marks his first movie with the Viva film production. In the same year, he led a major concert together with Billy Crawford and James Reid named as "The Crew" (stylized as The CR3W) at the Smart Araneta Coliseum produced by Viva Live and presented by Scratch It. In 2019, Concepcion was announced to lead the new season of HBO Asia's "Halfworlds," a fantasy series where bloodthirsty creatures from Asian mythologies live out in the open amongst humans. He will star in the show with Bianca Umali and will be directed by Mikhail Red. The production was put on hold and is still in post-production up to date.

In 2020, Trumpets’ longest running musical "Joseph The Dreamer" originated in 1989 was revived and Concepcion was chosen for the lead role. It ran early 2020 and was actually the last production to have had a run before the lockdown due to the COVID pandemic. In July 2022, Joseph the Dreamer premiered back live at the Maybank Performing Arts Theater in Taguig City.

In 2021, he served as a judge in a singing competition in the Season 2 of TV5's Born to Be a Star. In October 2021, Concepcion released his single "Diwata" and it was used as a soundtrack for Miss Universe Philippines 2021. He performed the song for the first time during the live coronation of Miss Universe Philippines. An accompanying music video and the single was officially released on various streaming sites after. In 2022, Concepcion returned to the Miss Universe stage and launched his new single "Dalisay" which was used for the 2022 edition of the said pageant.

Philanthropy

In October 2008, Concepcion was appointed by the Philippine Department of Education as the Youth Role Model and Spokesperson. Being its Ambassador for Education, Concepcion was tasked onto a nationwide school tour, dubbed as, SAMa-SAMa sa Eskwela, that aimed to encourage students across the country to prioritize their education while reaching for their aspirations. Former Education Secretary Jesli Lapus asked Concepcion to inspire young Filipinos to see how education can improve oneself. He stated, "We need somebody like Sam to remind the youth that education can be enjoyable and can bring us close to our dreams..". As a spokesperson, Concepcion spearhead campaigns and advocate co-curricular concerns through the "SAMa SAMa sa Eskwela" project and other activities. He managed to visit 50 schools and 100,000 students on its first month and had been to various points in the country like Pampanga, Bohol, Laguna, Cebu City, Cagayan de Oro, and Davao City. Concepcion, on his talk highlights the importance of literacy, English proficiency, finding one's talent, and excelling in school. Having joined many government campaigns like "Go Negosyo", and "Anti-Smoking Campaign of the World Health Organization," Dep Ed National Director Joey Pelaez is amazed at Sam's drawing power among the youth. He also becomes one of the National Book Development Board's (NBDB) Get Caught Reading campaign ambassadors in 2007.

Concepcion was then appointed by the Business Software Alliance as the Official Spokesperson of the Philippines for B4USurf, an Asian-wide campaign that aimed to promote safe internet use. In addition, Concepcion is still the Youth Ambassador for Education and the Arts in the 3rd District of Manila during that time. For the campaign, he launched his PaperClay Art Competition at the Manila Ocean Park with a theme, "Ako Para sa Kalikasan".

In 2008, Concepcion has found another interest, which is advocating the rights and welfare of every Filipino child as he is the latest appointee for World Vision's Ambassador for Children. As World Vision ambassador, he becomes active in various World Vision activities. He embarked in visiting poor municipalities and provinces in the Philippines to encourage everyone to share their blessings, so poor Filipino families can experience the joy of Christmas through World Vision's "Noche Buena Gift". On early 2009, he visited Palawan, particularly far-flung areas of the province to see the lives of the Filipino children. In the same year, Concepcion was also appointed as the Youth Ambassador for Education and the Arts in the 3rd District of Manila wherein he launched his "PaperClay Art Competition" at the Manila Ocean Park with a theme, "Ako Para sa Kalikasan". He believes that PaperClay art is a great tool in exercising the creativity of students and the youth. In May 2009, Concepcion held another major concert entitled, I'll Find Your Heart: Part 2 held at the Crossroads77 Convenarium in Quezon City. This concert-for-cause helped raise funds for Aim Christian Learning Center. When the Philippines was hit by Typhoon Ondoy, Concepcion along with other celebrities helped in distributing relief goods to the isolated families in evacuation centers in Metro Manila. In Marikina, who was the mostly affected by the typhoon, Concepcion gathered all the children for interaction to encourage positivity among them especially those who are traumatized by the disaster.

In December 2011, Concepcion and Star Magic artists, led by actor Piolo Pascual held a one-night concert dubbed as "A Night to Give Back" at Zirkoh Morato, wherein handicapped and disadvantaged children were the main beneficiaries. The proceeds of the concert were donated to Elsie Gaches, Reception and Study Center for Children, Sanctuary Center and Sagip Kapamilya. In the same month, Concepcion also attended a feeding program for undernourished children from Teresa Heights in Fairview, Quezon City. On December 29, 2011, Concepcion was joined by co-ambassador Tippy Dos Santos in the culminating activity of the "Child Friendly Space (CFS)" in the evacuation center situated in the village of Macasandig, Cagayan de Oro to give relief efforts to the victims of Typhoon Sendong. The two also visited some of the hardest-hit areas in Tibasak and Sitio Cala-Cala wherein they listened and bonded with the survivor families and children. "The typhoon left thousands of children homeless and vulnerable," shares Sam. "In my own little way, I hope to comfort their weary hearts", he added.

On September 30, 2012, Concepcion alongside other ambassadors for World Vision Organization including Tippy Dos Santos, Gloc 9, Ogie Alcasid and Nikki Gil joined the campaign against world hunger taglined as "Your Hunger can Feed a Child" held at the SM North Edsa Skydome. This annual event, on its third year in the Philippines, is part of a worldwide movement that aims to raise awareness and funds to fight hunger, especially among children.

In 2013, Concepcion is one among Filipino artists who performed at the annual MYX! Mo, 2013 concert held at the Mall of Asia Concert Grounds, in which the proceeds went to the millions of victims of Typhoon Haiyan (Yolanda), the strongest typhoon ever recorded that hit the country.

Products and endorsements

Before getting his break to his television career in 2004, Concepcion appeared through Maggi Sinigang sa Miso commercial, which features his real-life father. Concepcion raps in the commercial with the line "Parang may isang anghel sa aking labi/ Na nakalutang sa ulap / At nangingiliti / Kung ang alat at asim ng buhay ay tulad ng hain ni Inay / Suspetsa ko buong mundo’y / magiging mapayapa at masaya", became popular to various children of different ages. In 2006, even before winning the title in Little Big Star, Concepcion was offered endorsements and projects already. His first endorsement came from Bench, a local clothing line in the Philippines. In the same year, he endorsed an online game, Ragnarok which later become a trend to the Filipino youth and Stresstabs "Commute". In 2009, Concepcion becomes endorser for the local clothing brand Bench, wherein in 2012 he became the youngest model to ramp the runway during the Bench Fashion Show of that year. In the same year, he was contracted by a food chain Karate Kid as its first and sole celebrity endorser. It then opened Concepcion's door to various endorsements such as Skechers and "TANG" Fruit Teaz. In 2010, he joined his co-S.T.A.G.E.S actor Christian Bautista for "Blackwater Jr." cologne. In 2011, he became one of the endorsers of another food chain in the Philippines, Jollibee, as part of his role as one of the company's YUMbassadors. He promotes the slogan "I am Pinoy, I am Young, I Yum" promoting Filipino values, the youth spirit and the Jollibee Yum-burger.

In 2012, Concepcion recorded a jingle together with Julie Anne San Jose, which turned out to be a theme song for a cellphone brand, My|Phone. He led the ad together with various teen stars from three biggest networks in the Philippines, GMA Network, ABS-CBN and TV5. On the same year, Concepcion ramp for the second time at the year's Bench Fashion Show dubbed as "Bench Universe" held at the Mall of Asia Arena. In the same year, he and model-actor Ivan Dorschner endorses the ABE International Business College. After ending his contract with SMART, he was launched as the newest endorser of Sun Cellular alongside college basketball player Kiefer Ravena and young entrepreneur Marco Lobregat on August 30, 2012. During his contract signing held at Galleria Corporate Center in Quezon City, he officially assumed his role to represent the pioneer of "Call and Text Unlimited" of one of the leading telecommunications companies in the Philippines. He also recorded the song "Where I Belong" as the theme song for the network's ads.

Discography

Studio albums
 Sam Concepcion (2007)
 Infinite (2013)
 Bago (2016)

Extended plays
 I'll Find Your Heart (Music+Videos) (2008)
 Forever Young (2011)

Concert/Tours

Filmography

Awards and nominations
Here is the incomplete list of awards and nominations and various recognitions received by Sam Concepcion.

References

External links
 Sam Concepcion Official Site
 
 
 

1992 births
Living people
People from Manila
Filipino male television actors
21st-century Filipino male actors
21st-century Filipino male singers
Filipino male pop singers
Filipino male models
Singing talent show winners
ABS-CBN personalities
Star Magic
Viva Artists Agency
VJs (media personalities)
Reality show winners
Filipino male musical theatre actors
Filipino male film actors